Body God  is a 2022 Indian Kannada-language black comedy film produced and directed by Prabhu Srinivas, starring Manoj Kumaraswamy and Guruprasad with an ensemble supporting cast. Karan B Krupa composed the film's songs and background score. The story is written by Prabhu Srinivas and screenplay by Prabhu Srinivas, Co-director Vyshak, Karundhel Rajesh and Naveen Reddy of Akira fame. Prashanth Y N, Abhinandan Deshpriya and S.K.S penned the dialogues.

Premise 
Vasu, a middle-class man leading a complicated life, is appointed to look after Puttanna, a paralyzed and arrogant old man. When Puttanna mysteriously dies, Vasu covers the death and convinces everyone that Puttanna is alive. How long will it work?

Cast 
Manoj Kumaraswamy as Vasu
Guruprasad as Puttanna
Padmaja Rao as Padma 
Prabhu Srinivas as Sync Seena
Niranjan as Sub Inspector
Ashwin as Mahesh
Shankar Krishnamurthy as L.K.Balu

Production 
Prabhu Srinivas and Dhananjay were originally supposed to collaborate for the film Daali. The film, however, was put on hold due to the COVID-19 pandemic as several scenes were to be shot outside Karnataka. Later, Prabhu Srinivas teamed up for Body God Kannada movie with Manoj Kumaraswamy and Guruprasad for this comedy entertainer.

Music
The film's soundtrack album and score was composed by Karan B Krupa.

References

External links 
 

2022 films
2022 black comedy films
Indian black comedy films
2020s Kannada-language films
Films directed by Prabhu Srinivas